Thomas Bond may refer to:

Thomas Bond (British surgeon) (1841–1901), British surgeon
Thomas Bond (American physician) (1712–1784), American physician and surgeon 
Thomas Bond (topographer) (1765–1837), British topographical writer
Thomas Bond Walker (1861–1933), Irish painter
Tommy Bond (1926–2005), American actor
Tommy Bond (baseball) (1856–1941), Irish-born Major League Baseball pitcher
Sir Thomas Bond, 1st Baronet (died 1685), English aristocrat and property developer
Sir Thomas Bond, 3rd Baronet (1709–1734), of the Bond baronets
Sir Thomas Bond, 2nd Baronet (1776–1823), of the Bond baronets
Thomas Bonde, MP for Malmesbury
Thomas Bond (MP for Coventry) for Coventry (UK Parliament constituency)
Thomas Hinckley Bond (1804–1882), New York and Connecticut politician

See also
Bond (disambiguation)